Concordiensis is the student-run newspaper of Union College in Schenectady, New York, United States. It was founded in November 1877 and is the thirteenth oldest student newspaper in the United States and is the oldest continuously published newspaper in the city of Schenectady. The newspaper's title, meaning "of or pertaining to union," was most likely suggested by Frederic F. Chisholm '79 and has been in use since 1890. Since then, it has been informally called "the Concordy."

Founding history

The Concordiensis is the third student publication in Union College History. It was preceded by the College Spectator (1872–75) and the Union College Magazine (a literary magazine in 1875).

Production history

Over its long history, the Concordy has gone through numerous changes in format and frequency of publication.

Format: 8 inches by 11 inches

1877-1889: Monthly
1890-1896: Bi-weekly
Centennial Commencement Week, 1895: Daily
1896-1916: Weekly

Format: 4-column tabloid

1916-1918: Three times a week
Sep. 1918- Jan. 1919: None, World War I
1919-1927: Two times a week

Format: 6-columns wide, 17-inches high
1927-1928: Two times a week

Format: 5-columns wide, 15-inches high
1928-Feb 1942: Two times a week

Reduced Format
1943-End of World War II: Weekly
Summer 1943, World War II Summer Session

Format: 4-pages
Post-WWII: Weekly

Format: 6-8 pages, horizontal make-up
1948-1968: Weekly

Format: 16 pages, tabloid
2009-2011: Weekly
2014–Present

Format: 20 pages, tabloid
2011–2014: Weekly

National exposure

John Sweeney, 2006
The Concordiensis garnered national attention in April 2006 when it ran a front page story on former Republican Congressman (NY) John Sweeney's late-night appearance at a fraternity party on campus. The Concordy based its report on eyewitness testimonies from students. The students claimed Sweeney had acted openly intoxicated and behaved inappropriately, making hostile remarks towards one female about her political affiliations. Cell phone photographs also surfaced after the incident and were included in the Concordy's coverage.

Co-editors-in-chief Matt Smith and Alla Abramov made the decision to run the story based on a lack of denial from Sweeney's camp. With the help of former editor-in-chief Joanna Stern, Smith and Abramov faxed copies to local Albany newspapers. That weekend, the story was picked up by major newswires and ran across the country.

The New York Times gave the story full coverage and ran the cell phone photos that had appeared in the Concordiensis.

Delta Delta Delta, 2011
In October 2011, the Concordiensis ran several pieces concerning a campus investigation into a Delta Delta Delta sorority party. Copies of one issue were stolen en masse from distribution boxes and thrown in the trash. The story was picked up by the Student Press Law Center and by College Media Matters, organizations that track national college press issues.

References

Bibliography

 Somers, Wayne, ed (2003). Encyclopedia of Union College History. Schenectady, New York: Union College. .

External links

Concordiensis archives (1887-2000) | NY State Historic Newspapers

Student newspapers published in New York (state)
Union College (New York)
Publications established in 1877
1877 establishments in New York (state)